The 2021 Big 12 Conference women's soccer tournament was the postseason women's soccer tournament for the Big 12 Conference held from October 31 to November 7, 2021. The 7-match tournament was held at the Round Rock Multipurpose Complex in Round Rock, Texas. The 8-team single-elimination tournament consisted of three rounds based on seeding from regular season conference play. The Kansas Jayhawks were the defending champions from 2019.  There was no tournament held in 2020 due to the COVID-19 pandemic.  Kansas was unable to defend its title as the team did not qualify for the tournament.  TCU won the title by defeating Texas 2–1 in the final. This was the first title in school history for TCU and head coach Eric Bell. As tournament champions, TCU earned the Big 12's automatic berth into the 2021 NCAA Division I Women's Soccer Tournament.

Bracket

Schedule

Quarterfinals

Semifinals

Final

Statistics

Goalscorers

All-Tournament team 
Source:

 * Offensive MVP
 ^ Defensive MVP

References 

 
Big 12 Conference Women's Soccer Tournament